Honyman is a surname. Notable persons with that surname include:

 Andrew Honeyman aka Andrew Honyman (died 1676), Scottish priest, Bishop of Orkney 1664–1676
 John Honyman  (1613–1636), English actor
 Sir William Honyman, 1st Baronet (1756–1835), also known as Lord Armadale, Scottish landowner and judge from Orkney
 George Honyman (1819–1875), English judge
 Robert Honyman (Royal Navy officer) (1765–1848), Royal Navy Admiral, Member of Parliament (MP) for Orkney and Shetland 1796–1806
 Robert Honyman (British Army officer) (1781–1808), Lt Colonel in the Army, MP for Orkney and Shetland 1806–07
 Sir Richard Honyman, 2nd Baronet (1787–1842), MP for Orkney and Shetland 1812–18

See also
 Honeyman (disambiguation)
Honyman baronets